Crime in Guyana is investigated by Guyana's police.

Crime by type

Murder 

In the 20th century, crime in Guyana was not properly documented, however the country was known to be extremely dangerous and violent. The chart below shows the Guyanese homicide rate from 1990 until 2020, wher Guyana reported a peak intentional homicide rate of 28 murders per 100,000 in 2003 and a low of 10 murders per 100,000 in 2000. The 20 murders per 100,000 reported in 2020, was the fourth highest murder rate in South America and the sixth highest in Caricom.

Domestic violence 

Domestic violence is a problem in all regions of Guyana. Enforcement of the domestic violence laws is especially weak in the interior, where police do not have as strong a presence and courts meet only once a quarter.

NGOs report a widespread perception that some police officers and magistrates could be bribed to make cases of domestic violence "go away." The government also does not prosecute cases in which the alleged victim or victim's family agreed to drop the case in exchange for a monetary payment out of court. NGOs assert the need for a specialized Family Court.

Robbery 
Armed robberies occur regularly, especially in businesses and shopping districts, especially in the capital Georgetown. Nationally, there were 512 robberies under arms during the period January to October 2012 (a 15% increase from 2011).

By location

Georgetown 
In Georgetown, high crime areas include Tiger Bay, Albouystown, Sophia, all of south Georgetown, Buxton and Agricola. Robberies are a daily occurrence in the Stabroek Market area. A number of assaults have taken place in the Botanic Gardens.

References